Thomas Rudolph (born 15 June 1970 in Erfurt, Thuringia) is a German luger who competed in the early 1990s. Together with Yves Mankel he won the silver medal in the men's doubles event at the 1992 Winter Olympics in Albertville.

Rudolph also won a silver in the men's doubles event at the 1991 FIL World Luge Championships in Winterberg, Germany. He also won a complete set of medals at the FIL European Luge Championships with a gold in the mixed team event (1992), a silver in the mixed team event (1994), and a bronze in the men's doubles event (1994).

Rudolph's best overall finish in the Luge World Cup was second in men's doubles twice (1991-2, 1995–6).

References
Databaseolympics.com information on Rudolph
Fuzilogik Sports - Winter Olympic results - Men's luge
Hickoksports.com results on Olympic champions in luge and skeleton.
Hickok sports information on World champions in luge and skeleton.
List of European luge champions 
List of men's doubles luge World Cup champions since 1978.

1970 births
Living people
Sportspeople from Erfurt
German male lugers
Lugers at the 1992 Winter Olympics
Olympic silver medalists for Germany
Olympic lugers of Germany
Olympic medalists in luge
Medalists at the 1992 Winter Olympics